Motown Software (also known as Motown Games) was an American video game publisher company that was a spinoff from the Motown record label.

They were responsible for publishing African American-oriented video games during the 1990s. Only two games were released from this development company and both received negative criticism. However, Rap Jam: Volume One received more popularity on MobyGames than Bébé's Kids, which was indicated on Everything2.com as being an "extremely crappy game."

Video games

Super NES
 Bébé's Kids (1994)
 Rap Jam: Volume One (1995)

References

Software
Video game publishers
Defunct video game companies of the United States
Software companies based in California
Technology companies based in Greater Los Angeles
Video game companies established in 1994
Video game companies disestablished in 1996
1994 establishments in California
1996 disestablishments in California
Defunct companies based in Greater Los Angeles